Henryk Gold (19029 January 1977 in New York City, United States) was a Polish-born American composer, arranger, and orchestra director.

He was born in Warsaw to a musical family: his mother Helena was of the famous Warsaw klezmer Melodysta family, and his father Michael was a flautist in the Warsaw Opera Orchestra.  He was the brother of Artur Gold.  He studied in Warsaw, his teachers including Stanisław Barcewicz (violin).

When silent movies in Poland lost popularity following the arrival of Al Jolson's The Jazz Singer, (known in Yiddish as The Singing Buffoon), thousands of Polish musicians who'd played in the movie theaters lost their livelihood; they began to create large and small orchestras playing dance music and jazz. Artur and Henryk Gold, the brothers Jerzy and Stanislaw Petersburski, Zygmunt Karasinski and Szymon Kataszek, Kazimierz Englard, Julian Halicki were the pioneers; Henryk Gold was chief among them, giving concerts at the famous Ziemiańska Cafe on Kredytowa Street and the revue theater "Morskie-Oko" on Sienkiewicz Street. He ran the nightclub "Adria" with his brother on Moniuszki Street.

Gold wrote hundreds of tangos, polkas, foxtrots, and waltzes, interpolating Jewish motifs. His hits included Tęsknota (Nostalgia, in Yiddish Benkshaft); Jaśminy (Jasmine); Jak ja się dziś upiję (When I Get Drunk Today, in Yiddish Az 'Khvel Mikh Haynt Onshikirn); Moja pierswsza i ostatnia (My First and Last, Yiddish Mayn Ershte Un Letste); Szkoda twoich łez (Too bad about your tears, Yiddish A Shod Dayne Trern), and others.

During the Second World War, he and fellow composer Jerzy Petersburski toured the Soviet Union with a large jazz orchestra. In 1942 he left the Soviet Union with the Polish Anders Army, went to Israel, where he wrote songs "Arcenu ha-ktantonet", "Ruakh", "Shalom" and lastly emigrated to New York City, United States.

References

External links 
sztetl.org.pl
 Polish Tangos: The Unique Inter-War Soundtrack to Poland’s Independence

1902 births
1977 deaths
Jewish cabaret performers
Polish composers
Polish cabaret performers
Jewish American composers
American people of Polish-Jewish descent
Musicians from Warsaw
Polish emigrants to the United States
20th-century American composers
20th-century comedians
20th-century American Jews